"You Make the Rain Fall" is the second single from American musician Kevin Rudolf's second studio album To the Sky. The single features American rapper Flo Rida and is produced by Dr. Luke The single was released on September 14, 2010, and received airplay on AOL Radio's New Pop First Radio station and MuchMusic.

Music video
The music video for "You Make the Rain Fall" was premiered on Kevin Rudolf's Vevo account on August 27, 2010.

Other media
It also served as the theme music for WWE NXT Season 3.

Chart performance
"You Make the Rain Fall" debuted at number 94 on the Canadian Hot 100 on July 3, 2010, (it appeared on the chart as a non-single), and dropped off the chart after one week. On the week of September 18, 2010, the song re-entered the chart at number 99, and later climbed to number 59.

References

Kevin Rudolf songs
Flo Rida songs
2010 songs
Cash Money Records singles
Song recordings produced by Dr. Luke
Songs written by Kevin Rudolf
Songs written by Flo Rida
2010 singles